Adam Stein is an American film director and screenwriter working in Los Angeles, California.

Stein graduated from Harvard University and the directing program at the USC School of Cinematic Arts. He co-directed the Disney live-action movie Kim Possible, and also co-wrote and directed the award-winning independent film Freaks, working with partner Zach Lipovsky. In 2019, he was nominated for an Emmy award for Outstanding Directing for his work on the TV series Mech-X4.

Prior to directing, Stein edited several independent features that played at film festivals such as Sundance, Tribeca, and SXSW.

On The Lot
Adam Stein was a contestant on On The Lot, the Fox Television reality show produced by Steven Spielberg and Mark Burnett.

The films that Adam Stein created for On The Lot consistently received the highest reviews from the show's judges. Actress/writer Carrie Fisher said of his film Army Guy: "that was one of the most innovative, freaky, fantastic films I have seen." Director Gary Ross called Stein's filmmaking "charming, unbelievably ambitious, and really really technically proficient."

At least one celebrity judge chose Stein as their favorite filmmaker each time he made a film. New York Magazine called the director a "wunderkind". When Film Threat reviewed his film Dough: The Musical, the magazine said that it "covered a lot of visual ground and was extremely accomplished in lyrics, dancing, singing and acting."

Writing and directing
In 2018, it was announced that Stein would co-direct a live-action adaptation of the hit animated TV series Kim Possible. The movie aired February 15, 2019 on Disney Channel.

The independent feature film Freaks that Stein wrote and directed with partner Zach Lipovsky premiered at the Toronto Film Festival and has won awards at several film festivals around the world. The Vancouver Film Festival, which awarded Stein and Lipovsky "Best Emerging Director," said that their film "ratchets up the go-for-broke audacity as it laces the family drama of Room with genre confections indebted to vintage Spielberg." Freaks was released in theaters on September 13, 2019.

In 2016, Adam Stein directed episodes for the first and second seasons of the Disney XD series Mech-X4. He was also the director of the Disney Channel pilot "Forever Boys." Before that, he directed comedy pieces for Jimmy Kimmel Live! on ABC.

Stein has written and directed dozens of short films and music videos, which have been released around the world. He directed the music video "Suburban Symphony" for the Yo-Yo Ma Plays Ennio Morricone album. This music video was first screened at an orchestral performance conducted by Andrea Morricone, with Yo-Yo Ma playing live. The music video was then sold as part of the album's bonus DVD.

His USC film Hot Java played at many festivals around the country and won the top prize at the Gen Art Film Festival. His film script Tangles won an Alfred P. Sloan Foundation grant for screenwriting.

With film school collaborator Sam Friedlander and actor Mark Feuerstein, he made "Lazy Monday", an online parody described as a "west coast rap battle" response to Saturday Night Lives "Lazy Sunday". This video was widely played and widely copied, being featured on VH1, Bravo, and many other media outlets. After the release of this video, CNN's Paula Zahn interviewed Stein and Feuerstein about making content for the web.

Editing

Stein has worked as an editor on several feature films, including: 
 Blue State, starring Anna Paquin and Breckin Meyer
 Fifty Pills, starring Kristen Bell and Lou Taylor Pucci
 Flakes, starring Zooey Deschanel
 The documentary Who Killed the Electric Car?, which premiered at Sundance in 2006.

References

External links
 Adam Stein's Official Site
 
 Stein's page at the Directors Guild of America

USC School of Cinematic Arts alumni
Harvard University alumni
Year of birth missing (living people)
Living people
People from Miami
Participants in American reality television series
Film directors from Florida